"Trust Fund Baby" is a song by American boy band Why Don't We. The song was released as a digital download on February 1, 2018 by Signature and Atlantic Records, and features on the deluxe edition of their debut studio album 8 Letters. The song peaked at number twenty on the US Bubbling Under Hot 100 Singles chart.

Background
Talking about the song with BuzzFeed, Jack Avery said, "The recording process was fun because it was our first time actually stepping into a big studio after recording from our rooms for our other EPs. We went in and connected with Steve Mac, who was really awesome and humble, got some takes done quickly and now we have this amazing song." After recording their previously released EPs in a home studio, the band upgraded to a professional studio for the song "Trust Fund Baby". The song was co-written by Ed Sheeran, describing what they learned from Sheeran, Daniel Seavey said, "Seeing how passionate he still is with all of his success. He could right now be like, 'I'm done' and be good for the rest of his life, but it's not about being good for the rest of his life. It's about the music."

Music video
A music video to accompany the release of "Trust Fund Baby" was first released onto YouTube on March 1, 2018.

Awards and nominations

Track listing

Personnel
Credits adapted from Tidal.
 Steve Mac – Producer, keyboards, writer
 Yates – Producer, keyboards, programmer
 Chris Laws – Additional Drums, engineer
 Ed Sheeran – Background Vocals, writer
 Bill Zimmerman – Engineer
 Dann Pursey – Engineer
 Chris Gehringer – Mastering Engineer
 Phil Tan – Mixing Engineer
 Corbyn Besson – Vocals
 Daniel Seavey – Vocals
 Jack Avery – Vocals
 Jonah Marais – Vocals
 Zach Herron – Vocals
 Fred – Writer

Charts

Certifications

Release history

References

2018 songs
2018 singles
Why Don't We songs
Songs written by Ed Sheeran
Songs written by Fred Again
Songs written by Steve Mac
Song recordings produced by Steve Mac